Aris Fioretos (born 6 February 1960 in Gothenburg) is a Swedish writer of Greek and Austrian extraction.

Biography 
Aris Fioretos was born in Gothenburg. His Greek father was a professor of medicine, his Austrian mother ran a gallery. At home, German and Swedish were spoken. He grew up in Lund. He studied with Jacques Derrida in Paris, later at Stockholm and Yale Universities. Fioretos is married to art gallerist Marina Schiptjenko.

Work 
In 1991, Fioretos published his first book, a collection of prose poetry entitled Delandets bok (The Book of Imparting). Since then he has published several works of fiction, including Vanitasrutinerna (The Vanity Routines) (1998), Stockholm Noir (2000), Sanningen om Sascha Knisch (The Truth about Sascha Knisch) (2002), and Den sista greken (The Last Greek) (2009). The latter novel was shortlisted for Sweden's most prestigious literary award, the August Prize, as was his 2015 novel Mary. In the winter of 2009 Den sista greken was awarded the Gleerups Literary Prize, in the spring of 2010 the Novel Prize of Sveriges Radio – an honor also bestowed upon Mary in 2016. Between 2003 and 2007, Fioretos was Cultural Counsellor at the Swedish Embassy in Berlin. Fioretos's contribution to Sweden's most popular radio show, Sommar ("Summer"), a series of self-portraits by Swedes famous and unknown, was aired on 16 July 2010. An extensive treatment of his literary work until 2012 is made in a conversation, in Swedish, with literary critic Mikael van Reis.

In 1991, Fioretos earned his PhD in Comparative Literature with The Critical Moment, a deconstructivist analysis of works by Friedrich Hölderlin, Walter Benjamin, and Paul Celan. He has held academic appointments at the Johns Hopkins University, Rutgers University, Free University, and Humboldt University, the latter two both in Berlin. Since 2010, he is a professor of Aesthetics at Södertörn University College in Stockholm.

Fioretos has received numerous grants and awards both in Sweden and abroad, including from The Getty Center for the History of Art and the Humanities, the Swedish Academy, the Alexander von Humboldt-Stiftung, the DAAD Künstlerprogramm Berlin, the Bank of Sweden Tercentenary Fund, the American Academy in Berlin, and All Souls College, Oxford. Fioretos is a member of the Deutsche Akademie für Sprache und Dichtung in Darmstadt, where, in 2011, he was elected vice president. Since 2022, he is also a member of Akademie der Künste in Berlin.

Fioretos has translated books by Paul Auster, Friedrich Hölderlin, Vladimir Nabokov, and Walter Serner, among others, into Swedish. He writes regularly for Sweden's largest daily, Dagens Nyheter. His fiction has been translated into several languages – including English, French, German, Dutch, Greek, Norwegian, Romanian, and Serbian. The English edition of The Truth about Sascha Knisch was translated by Fioretos himself.

Bibliography 

 Delandets bok (The Book of Imparting), prose poetry (1991)
 Det kritiska ögonblicket (The Critical Moment), scholarly essays (1991)
 Den grå boken (The Gray Book), essay (1994)
 En bok om fantomer (A Book about Phantoms), essay (1996)
 Vanitasrutinerna (The Vanity Routines), short prose (1998)
 Stockholm noir (Stockholm Noir), novel (2000)
 Skallarna (The Skulls), essay (2001) (with Katarina Frostenson)
 Sanningen om Sascha Knisch (The Truth about Sascha Knisch), novel (2002)
 Berlin über und unter der Erde (Berlin Above and Below Ground), editor (2007)
 Vidden av en fot (The Width of a Foot), essays, prose, aphorisms (2008)
 Babel: Festschrift für Werner Hamacher (Babel), editor (2008)
 Den siste greken (The Last Greek), novel (2009)
 Flucht und Verwandlung: Nelly Sachs, Dichterin, Berlin/Stockholm (Flight and Metamorphosis) (2010)
 Halva solen (Half the Sun), prose (2012)
 Avtalad tid (Appointments), conversations with Durs Grünbein (2012)
 Mary (Mary), novel (2015)
 Vatten, gåshud (Water, Gooseflesh), essay (2015)
 Nelly B:s hjärta (Nelly B's Heart), novel (2018) inspired by the life of the first German woman pilot Amelie Beese.
 Atlas (Atlas), prose (2019)
 De tunna gudarna (The Thin Gods), novel (2022)

Books in English:
 Word Traces: New Readings of Paul Celan, editor (Johns Hopkins University Press, 1994)
 The Solid Letter: Readings of Friedrich Hölderlin, editor (Stanford University Press, 1999)
 The Gray Book (own translation of Den grå boken) (Stanford University Press, 1999)
 Re: The Rainbow, editor (Propexus, 2004)
 The Truth about Sascha Knisch (own translation of Sanningen om Sascha Knisch (Jonathan Cape, 2006; Vintage, 2008)
 Nelly Sachs, Flight and Metamorphosis (translation of Flucht und Verwandlung) (Stanford University Press, 2012)

Translations into Swedish:
 Jacques Derrida, Schibboleth, with Hans Ruin (1990)
 Friedrich Hölderlin, Hymner (1991), revised edition: Sånger (2001), second revised and enlarged edition: Kom nu, eld! (2013)
 Paul Auster, Att uppfinna ensamheten (The Invention of Solitude) (1992)
 Paul Auster, Den röda anteckningsboken (The Red Notebook) (1993)
 Vladimir Nabokov, Pnin (Pnin) (2000)
 Vladimir Nabokov, Masjenka (Mary) (2001)
 Vladimir Nabokov, Sebastian Knights verkliga liv (The Real Life of Sebastian Knight) (2002)
 Vladimir Nabokov, Lolita (Lolita) (2007)
 Walter Serner, Handbok för svindlare (Letzte Lockerung) (2010)
 Peter Waterhouse, Pappren mellan fingrarna (Paper between Fingers) (2011)
 Vladimir Nabokov, Ögat (The Eye) (2015)
 Jan Wagner, Självporträtt med bisvärm (Self-Portrait with Bee Swarm) (2016)
 Vladimir Nabokov, Förtvivlan (Despair) (2017)
 Vladimir Nabokov, Genomskinliga ting (Transparent Things) (2017)
 Vladimir Nabokov, Bragden (Glory) (2020)
 Jo Shapcott, Pissblomma (Pissflower) (2022)

Editions:
 Nelly Sachs, Werke, general editor of the commented edition in four volumes (Suhrkamp, 2010–2011); editor for volumes III (Scenic Poetry) and IV (Prose and Translations)

Prizes 

 The A. Owen Aldridge Prize, ACLA 1989
 The Karin and Karl Ragnar Gierow Prize, Swedish Academy, 1994
 The Winter Prize of the De Nio Foundation, 2000
 The Lydia and Herman Eriksson's Prize, Swedish Academy, 2003
 The Gleerups Literary Prize, 2009
 The Novel Prize of Swedish Radio, 2010
 Preis der SWR-Bestenliste, 2011
 Sture Linnér Prize, 2011
 The Kellgren Prize, Swedish Academy, 2011
 The Sorescu Prize, Romanian Culturual Institute, 2012
 Independent Publisher Book Award, Silver Medal, Biography 2013
 The Big Prize, Samfundet De Nio, 2013
 The Novel Prize of Swedish Radio, 2016
 The Jeanette Schocken Prize (Bremerhaven), 2017
 The Essay Prize, Swedish Academy, 2018
 Order of Merit of the Federal Republic of Germany, 2020

References

External links 

arisfioretos.com

1960 births
Living people
Swedish male writers
Swedish people of Greek descent
People from Gothenburg
Yale University alumni
Stockholm University alumni
Johns Hopkins University faculty
Rutgers University faculty
Academic staff of the Free University of Berlin
Academic staff of Södertörn University
Recipients of the Cross of the Order of Merit of the Federal Republic of Germany